Ronald E. McNair High School is a high school in Stockton, California, United States. Opened in 2005, it is the newest high school in Lodi Unified School District.  The school is named after Dr. Ronald E. McNair (1950–1986), a physicist and astronaut who died in the 1986 Space Shuttle Challenger explosion.

References 

High schools in San Joaquin County, California
Public high schools in California
2005 establishments in California